The 1986 European Indoor Championships was a women's tennis tournament played on indoor carpet courts at the Saalsporthalle Allmend in Zürich in Switzerland and was part of the Category 3 tier of the 1986 WTA Tour. It was the third edition of the tournament and was held from 6 October until 12 October 1986. First-seeded Steffi Graf won the singles title.

Finals

Singles
 Steffi Graf defeated  Helena Suková 4–6, 6–2, 6–4
 It was Graf's 7th singles title of the year and of her career.

Doubles
 Steffi Graf /  Gabriela Sabatini defeated  Lori McNeil /  Alycia Moulton 1–6, 6–4, 6–4

References

External links
 ITF tournament edition details
 Tournament draws

European Indoors
Zurich Open
1986 in Swiss tennis